Leonard Garbett (1919  – 2009) was an English professional rugby league footballer who played in the 1930s and 1940s, and coached in the 1950s. He played at club level for Castleford (Heritage № 174), and coached at club level for Castleford.

Background
Len Garbett's birth was registered in Pontefract district, West Riding of Yorkshire, in 1986. He served in World War II. Len Garbett wrote and privately published a 160-Page soft-backed book entitled 'Castleford R.L.F.C. A Sixty Years History 1926 – 1986', and he died aged 89–90.

Playing career

County League appearances
Len Garbett played in Castleford's victory in the Yorkshire County League during the 1938–39 season.

Coaching career

Club career
Len Garbett was the coach of Castleford, his first game in charge was on Saturday 18 August 1956, and his last game in charge was on Saturday 30 November 1957.

Genealogical information
Len Garbett's marriage to Susan (née Liversidge) (birth registered) during third ¼  in Pontefract district) was registered during third ¼ 1942 in Pontefract district. They had children; Ian D. Garbett (birth registered during second ¼  in Pontefract district), and Roy Garbett (birth registered during second ¼  in Pontefract district).

References

External links
Search for "Garbett" at rugbyleagueproject.org

1919 births
2009 deaths
British military personnel of World War II
Castleford Tigers coaches
Castleford Tigers players
English rugby league coaches
English rugby league players
Rugby league players from Pontefract
Place of death missing